WMBR is the Massachusetts Institute of Technology's student-run college radio station, licensed to Cambridge, Massachusetts, and broadcasting on 88.1 FM. It is all-volunteer and funded by listener donations and MIT funds. Both students and community members can apply for positions, and like many college radio stations, WMBR offers diverse programming ranging from talk shows to music including RnB to electronic music.

As of 2022, the general manager is Claire McLellan-Cassivi and the program director is Shruti Ravikumar.

The station's board of trustees is the Technology Broadcasting Corporation, whose members are appointed by the President of MIT.  The officers are:
President - Marianna Parker;
Vice President - Joseph Paradiso;
Clerk - Todd Glickman;
Treasurer - Shawn Mamros.

History
WMBR is the third set of call letters for the station.

The first MIT student broadcasting station first signed on as WMIT on November 25, 1946. It had a "carrier current" AM transmitter located in the Ware entryway of Senior House dormitory and broadcast over power lines at 800, and later 640 kHz (called "kilocycles" at the time). Audible only within a few hundred feet of the dorms, under FCC Part 15 regulations it could and did broadcast commercials and was self-supporting. The station simultaneously provided audio signals of its broadcasts over "dorm line" wires that ran past exterior windows of the MIT dormitories, for residents to connect to their hi-fi gear. An early experiment in stereo broadcasting, in 1960, put one stereo channel on the AM signal and the other on the dorm lines.

In the mid-1950s, the possibility of an FM license was explored and it was discovered that the call letters WMIT were (and still are) in use by a North Carolina station serving the Asheville area. WTBS (for "Technology Broadcasting System") was chosen as the best alternative. New facilities were constructed in the basement of Walker Memorial, including a switching and mixing console designed by A. R. Kent and Barry Blesser, believed to be one of the first all-transistorized consoles ever built. On April 10, 1961, WTBS signed on with 14 watts of effective radiated power at 88.1 Megahertz FM, from a small antenna atop the Walker Memorial Building, the location of the station's studios. (This frequency corresponds to a wavelength of 3.40 meters, which is an integral number, specifically 2, of smoots.) In the early 1970s, the antenna was moved to the much higher Eastgate Apartment Building, dramatically improving the coverage area.

WTBS continued to operate the carrier-current system to the dormitories on 640 kHz, with an identical program, except for commercial breaks on the AM side, during which the noncommercial FM station filled time with public-service announcements, and, later, parody "ads" for fictitious products such as "Apple Gunkies" and firms such as "Nocturnal Aviation".  The carrier current transmission was discontinued in the early 1970s.   The all-request "Nite Owl" was a popular weekend feature, and a "Waveform of the Week" was broadcast for the enjoyment of MIT students watching the program on oscilloscopes.  Since the station allowed a certain amount of non-students to conduct shows, WTBS was able to tap into the vibrant music and arts community in the Cambridge-Boston area and was acknowledged as the metropolitan area's most eclectic station of the era, featuring jazz, folk music, rhythm and blues, classical music and among the first programs featuring the emerging "underground rock" music in the 1960s and the cutting edge, "new wave" music in the 1970s.

In 1978, Ted Turner, then operator of WTCG in Atlanta, Georgia, wanted to use the call letters "WTBS" (for Turner Broadcasting System). Although call letters are not technically for sale, Turner and WTBS worked out a stratagem whereby Turner gave a $25,000 donation to WTBS with an agreement that WTBS would apply for new call letters, with a second donation of $25,000 promised if the FCC were to subsequently grant the letters "WTBS" to Turner. All went as planned, WTBS used the donation for new transmitter equipment, and on November 10, 1979, the station signed on as WMBR with 200 watts of power, later increased to 720 watts. (The Atlanta station has since changed its call letters to WPCH-TV.)

References

Further reading
 "The Boston Radio Dial: WMBR(FM)" - information and history of WMBR

External links
Official WMBR website
WMBR Program Schedule

Track-blaster - WMBR's searchable playlist database
Late Risers Club website
Late Risers Club documentary website

MBR
Massachusetts Institute of Technology
Radio stations established in 1961
Cambridge, Massachusetts
Mass media in Middlesex County, Massachusetts
1961 establishments in Massachusetts